Bellura is a genus of moths of the family Noctuidae.

Species
 Bellura anoa (Dyar, 1913)
 Bellura brehmei (Barnes & McDunnough, 1916)
 Bellura densa (Walker, 1865)
 Bellura gortynoides Walker, 1865
 Bellura matanzasensis (Dyar, 1922)
 Bellura obliqua (Walker, 1865)
 Bellura pleostigma (Dyar, 1913)
 Bellura vulnifica (Grote, 1873) (syn: Arzama diffusa Grote, 1878, Arzama melanopyga Grote, 1881)

References
 Bellura at Markku Savela's Lepidoptera and Some Other Life Forms
 Natural History Museum Lepidoptera genus database

Caradrinini